*Mannaz is the conventional name of the m-rune  of the Elder Futhark. It is derived from the reconstructed  Common Germanic word for "man", *mannaz.

Younger Futhark ᛘ is maðr ("man"). It took up the shape of the algiz rune ᛉ, replacing Elder Futhark .

As its sound value and form in the Elder Futhark indicate, it is derived from the letter M in the Old Italic alphabets, ultimately from the Greek letter Mu (Μ).

Rune poems
The rune is recorded in all three rune poems, in the Norwegian and Icelandic poems as maðr, and in the Anglo-Saxon poem as man.

Modern usage
For the "man" rune of the Armanen Futharkh as "life rune" in Germanic mysticism, see Lebensrune.

References

See also

Runes